John Philliber (July 6, 1873 – November 6, 1944), was an American actor. Born in Elkhart, Indiana, Philliber was a stage actor for most of his career, but in his last year of life made several appearances in films, alluding to his old age, best remembered for his role as 'Pop Benson' in René Clair's classic fantasy comedy It Happened Tomorrow. He died in his hometown of Elkhart aged 71.

Broadway roles

 Winterset (1935) as hobo
 High Tor (1937) as Pieter
 The Star-Wagon (1937) as Misty
 Two On An Island (1940) as husband in married couples, New Yorkers & out-of-towners

Filmography

 A Lady Takes a Chance (1943) - Storekeeper
 The Impostor (1944) - Mortemart
 Double Indemnity (1944) - Joe Peters
 Ladies of Washington (1944) - Mother Henry
 It Happened Tomorrow (1944) - Pop Benson
 Summer Storm (1944) - Polycarp - Petroff's Butler
 Three Is a Family (1944) - Dr. Bartell
 Gentle Annie (1944) - Barrow (final film role)

External links

1873 births
1944 deaths
American male film actors
People from Elkhart, Indiana
20th-century American male actors